Grounding or grounded may refer to:

Science and philosophy
 Grounding (metaphysics), a topic of wide philosophical interest
 Grounding (psychology), a strategy for coping with stress or other negative emotions
 Grounding in communication, the collection of mutual knowledge, beliefs, and assumptions; "common ground"
 Ground (electricity), a common return path for electric current
 Symbol grounding, a problem in cognition and artificial intelligence

Arts and media
 Grounded (comics), a comic book by Mark Sable for Image Comics
 Grounded (video game), a multiplayer survival game by Obsidian Entertainment
 "Superman: Grounded" a storyline in the Superman comic book, written by J. Michael Straczynski
 Grounding (film), 2006 film about the collapse of the airline Swissair
 Unaccompanied Minors, a 2006 Christmas film that was titled Grounded in the UK and Ireland
 "Grounded", a song by Lower Than Atlantis from World Record
 "Grounded", a song by My Vitriol
 "Grounded", a song by Soul Asylum from the 1990 album And the Horse They Rode in On
 "Grounded", a song by Ross Jennings from the 2021 album A Shadow of My Future Self
 "Grounding", an interdisciplinary performance project by artist Gita Hashemi

Other uses
 Grounding (discipline technique), restrictions placed on movement, privileges, or both as punishment
 Grounding (nature therapy), a pseudoscientific practice that involves people grounding themselves to the Earth for health benefits
 Grounding Inc, a video game development company
 Aircraft grounding, a restriction to prevent malfunctioning aircraft from flying
 Intentional grounding, a rule violation in gridiron football
 Ship grounding, a type of marine accident

See also
 Ground (disambiguation)
 Ground truth
 Grind (disambiguation)